Robyn Stevens (born April 24, 1983) is an American Olympic race walker. She competed for Vacaville High School, then went on to San José State University. Stevens suffered from an eating disorder and body dysmorphia while attending , which forced her to quit racing in 2004. She would not compete again until 2014.  She competed in the 2020 Summer Olympics in Tokyo in 2021.

Competition
In 2019, Stevens won the U.S. 50 kilometer race walk championship, and repeated her win on January 25, 2020, in Santee, California, with a time of 4:37:31, leading from start to finish and winning by over 9 1/2 minutes. On February 2, she won the Utah indoor 3000 meters race walk. At the Millrose Games indoor mile in New York City on February 8, 2020, after an absence of 19 years, Stevens led for over half the race. She was passed by Ohio high school star Taylor Ewert who won in 6:34:63, and Lauren Harris, second in 6:39.31, with Stevens finishing third in 6:41:30.

Stevens won the 2020 USA Olympic Trial 20k race walk event in Eugene, Oregon, finishing in 1:35.13, over four minutes ahead of the second-place finisher. Stevens' boyfriend Nick Christie won the men's 20k at the same meet.

Stevens went on to compete in the delayed 2020 Summer Olympics in Tokyo in 2021, where she finished in 33rd place out of a field of 58 athletes. At the 2022 World Athletics Championships Stevens finished the 20km race walking competition in 24th place.

Sexual abuse by former coach

Stevens said she was repeatedly raped by  her former coach, Andreas “Dre” Gustafsson, over two and a half years starting in February 2017. Concerned that he was victimizing other female athletes, she filed a complaint with the U.S. Center for SafeSport in late 2020. In August 2022 SafeSport provisionally suspended Gustafsson for “sexual misconduct.” USA Track & Field told its members that Gustafsson was prohibited “from participating, in any capacity, in any event, program, activity, or competition authorized by, organized by or under the auspices of the USOPC, the National Governing Bodies recognized by the USOPC, a Local Affiliated Organization ... or at a facility under the jurisdiction of the same.” Gustafsson confirmed that he had consensual sex with Stevens multiple times while still married to his wife, but said it was consensual and "... she loved the sex we had together. She loved it. So, you know, her coming up a victim later on, that’s on her.”

References

External links
Robyn Stevens at the United States Olympic & Paralympic Committee

1983 births
Living people
American female racewalkers
San Jose State University alumni
Pan American Games track and field athletes for the United States
Athletes (track and field) at the 2019 Pan American Games
Athletes (track and field) at the 2020 Summer Olympics
San Jose State Spartans athletes
Olympic track and field athletes of the United States
20th-century American women
21st-century American women
People from Vacaville, California
Sexual assaults in the United States
Sexual misconduct allegations
Sexual assault in sports